The Incheon-class frigates (Hangul: 인천급 호위함, Hanja: 仁川級護衛艦), also known as the Future Frigate eXperimental or FFX during development, are coastal defense frigates of the Republic of Korea Navy. The lead ship was launched on 29 April 2011. The Incheon-class frigates will replace the aging fleet of s and s, and take over multi-role operations such as coast patrol, anti-submarine warfare and transport support. Later batches are planned to be specialized on anti-air and anti-submarine warfare.

Development

In the early 1990s, the Korean government plan for the construction of next generation coastal ships named "Frigate 2000" was scrapped due to the 1997 Asian financial crisis. But the decommissioning of the s and the aging fleet of s, the plan was revived as the Future Frigate eXperimental, also known as FFX in the early 2000s.

The Republic of Korea Navy (ROKN) initially wanted twenty-four 3,000 ton frigates to replace the Ulsan-, - and -class coastal fleet of 37 ships. It was later decided that six 2,700 ton ships will be constructed for the first batch. In 2008, the plan was further downgraded to 2,300 tons when president Lee Myung-bak took office, with the number of ships for the first batch down to six. Eight ships are planned for the second batch of FFX with the final goal of 20–22 frigates.

In 2010 the construction of the first FFX frigate was awarded to Hyundai Heavy Industry and in April 2011 the first of its class, ROKS Incheon was launched. The ship is named after the western port city of Incheon, representing the ROKN's initiative to defend the western islands due to the constant clashes with the North Korean navy in this area.

Armament 
The Incheon-class frigate's main gun is the 127 mm/L62 Mk. 45 Mod 4 naval gun. This was chosen over a smaller 76 mm for naval barrage support in amphibious landings and superiority in ship to ship firing. Point-defense armaments include a single 20 mm Phalanx CIWS and a RIM-116 Rolling Airframe Missile Block 1 21-round launcher. The anti-submarine warfare armaments consists of K745 LW Cheong Sahng-uh (Blue Shark) torpedoes. 

Anti-ship capability is provided by SSM-700K Haeseong (Sea Star) long-range anti-ship missiles, each with performance similar to the American Harpoon. Land-attack capability is provided by the recently developed Tactical Ship to Land attack missile, which is derived from the SSM-700K Haeseong; initially, the land attack missiles were planned to start arming batch 2 Incheon-class ships, but feasibility studies showed they could be retrofitted to batch 1 ships, which began in September 2016, enhancing their flexibility and deterrence capabilities with -range tactical missiles.

Ships in the class

Export market
A variant of the Incheon class was offered by Hyundai Heavy Industries to the Philippines' Department of National Defense for their requirement of two new frigates. On 24 October 2016, the contract to supply two brand new general purpose stealth frigates was signed between the Department of National Defense, represented by Defense Sec. Delfin Lorenzana, and Hyundai Heavy Industries, represented by its Senior Vice President Mr. Ki Sun Chung, under the presence of officials from the DND, AFP, PN, HHI, and the South Korean Ambassador to the Philippines.

In November 2012, it was reported that Israel was mulling a deal to purchase four Incheon-class frigates from South Korea, which would be built jointly by Hyundai Heavy Industries and Israel Shipyards.

References 

 
Frigate classes
Frigates of the Republic of Korea Navy
Frigates